Sviatoslav "Svi" Yuriyovych Mykhailiuk (born June 10, 1997) is a Ukrainian professional basketball player for the Charlotte Hornets of the National Basketball Association (NBA). He was selected with the 47th overall pick in the 2018 NBA draft by the Los Angeles Lakers.

Mykhailiuk played college basketball for the Kansas Jayhawks. Prior to playing at Kansas, he played for Cherkaski Mavpy in the Ukrainian Basketball SuperLeague from 2012 to 2014. He also played for the Ukrainian national team at the 2014 FIBA World Cup.

Early life
Born in Cherkasy, Ukraine, Mykhailiuk's mother, Inna, is a high school biology teacher, and his father, Iurri, is a college history professor. He attended high school at Cherkasy First City Gymnasia.

College career
Mykhailiuk received offers from Virginia, Iowa State, Oregon, and Kansas. On May 21, 2014, Mykhailiuk committed to play basketball at the University of Kansas and played for the team during their 2014–15 season. During his freshman season, he started five of the first seven games of the season, averaging 21.3 minutes a game, but his playing time since then was significantly curtailed. He scored 11 points while playing 32 minutes in the Orlando Classic Championship game against Michigan State on November 30, 2014. He was the youngest player in Big 12 Conference history at 17 years old.

Returning to Kansas in his sophomore year, Mykhailiuk averaged 5.4 points, 1.3 rebounds, and 0.9 assists per game in 35 games of the 2015–16 season while hitting 40.2 percent of his three-point shots. On November 23, 2015, Mykhailiuk scored 18 points against Chaminade. In the first round of the 2016 NCAA basketball tourney, on March 17, 2016, Mykhailiuk scored 23 points, setting his personal college career scoring record, with 9 of 11 field goals and 4 of 5 threes against the Austin Peay.

Mykhailiuk returned to Kansas for his junior year of college. On December 22, 2016, in a game against UNLV, Mykhailiuk scored 20 points with 6 rebounds, 2 assists, and 2 steals, helping KU to a 71-53 win. In the UNLV game, Mykhailiuk made 4 of 6 three-point attempts. In the 2016-17 season, Mykhailiuk averaged 10.6 points per game, 3.5 rebounds per game, and 1.6 assists per game, while shooting 41.5 percent from three-point territory. On April 12, 2017, Mykhailiuk decided to enter the 2017 NBA Draft, but did not hire an agent, allowing him to return for his senior year. Mykhailiuk opted to return to Kansas for the 2017–18 season.

On November 17, 2017, Mykhailiuk scored a career high 27 points in a game against San Diego State. He set a school record for 3–pointers made in a season during the Jayhawks 2017–18 season with 115.

Professional career

Cherkaski Mavpy (2012–2014)
Prior to playing at Kansas, Mykhailiuk played professionally for Cherkaski Mavpy, his hometown club team, in the Ukrainian Basketball SuperLeague from 2012 to 2014.

Los Angeles Lakers (2018–2019)
On June 21, 2018, Mykhailiuk was selected with the 47th overall pick in the 2018 NBA draft by the Los Angeles Lakers. On July 10, he signed a three-year, $4.6 million rookie scale contract with the Lakers.

Detroit Pistons (2019–2021)
On February 6, 2019, Mykhailiuk was traded to the Detroit Pistons, along with a future second-round draft pick, in exchange for Reggie Bullock.

Oklahoma City Thunder (2021)
On March 13, 2021, Mykhailiuk was traded to the Oklahoma City Thunder, along with a 2027 second-round draft pick, in exchange for Hamidou Diallo.

Toronto Raptors (2021–2022)
On August 31, 2021, Mykhailiuk signed a two-year deal with the Toronto Raptors for just over $3.6 million. On August 29, 2022, Mykhailiuk was waived.

New York Knicks (2022–2023) 
On September 18, 2022, Mykhailiuk signed with the New York Knicks.

Charlotte Hornets (2023–present) 
On February 9, 2023, Mykhailiuk was traded to the Charlotte Hornets in a four-team trade involving the Portland Trail Blazers and Philadelphia 76ers. He made his Hornets debut on February 15, recording 12 points and two rebounds in a 120–110 win over the San Antonio Spurs.

National team career

Ukrainian junior national team
In the summer of 2013, Mykhailiuk played with the Ukrainian Under-16 junior national team in the 2013 FIBA Europe Under-16 Championship. He was selected to the All-Tournament Team, after completing an outstanding championship, averaging 25.2 points, 8.0 rebounds and 3.4 assists per game.

Mykhailiuk played for the Ukrainian under-20 junior national team in the 2016 FIBA Europe Under-20 Championship in Helsinki. During the tournament, Mykhailiuk led his team in scoring, at 14.9 points per game, in seven tourney games. He hit 36.8 percent of his floor shots. Mykhailiuk shot 47.2 percent from two-point and 19 percent from three-point territory. He made 85.7 percent of his free throws and also grabbed 5.6 rebounds a game, with 2.7 assists, 4.7 turnovers, and 2.1 steals per game.

He played for the Ukrainian under-20 team again in the 2017 FIBA Europe Under-20 Championship, where he was the leading scorer of the tournament, averaging 20.4 points per game.

Ukrainian senior national team
Mykhailiuk played with the senior men's Ukrainian national basketball team, which competed at the 2014 FIBA Basketball World Cup, in Spain, from August 30 to September 14.

Career statistics

NBA

Regular season

|-
| style="text-align:left;"|
| style="text-align:left;"|L.A. Lakers
| 39 || 0 || 10.8 || .333 || .318 || .600 || .9 || .8 || .3 || .0 || 3.3
|-
| style="text-align:left;"|
| style="text-align:left;"|Detroit
| 3 || 0 || 6.7 || .250 || .500 ||  || .7 || 1.3 || .3 || .0 || 2.0
|-
| style="text-align:left;"|
| style="text-align:left;"|Detroit
| 56 || 27 || 22.6 || .410 || .404 || .814 || 1.9 || 1.9 || .7 || .1 || 9.0
|-
| style="text-align:left;"|
| style="text-align:left;"|Detroit
| 36 || 5 || 17.6 || .377 || .333 || .800 || 2.1 || 1.6 || .8 || .2 || 6.9
|-
| style="text-align:left;"|
| style="text-align:left;"|Oklahoma City
| 30 || 9 || 23.0 || .438 || .336 || .700 || 3.0 || 1.8 || .8 || .2 || 10.3
|-
| style="text-align:left;"|
| style="text-align:left;"|Toronto
| 56 || 5 || 12.8 || .389 || .306 || .865 || 1.6 || .8 || .5 || .1 || 4.6
|-
| style="text-align:left;"|
| style="text-align:left;"|New York
| 13 || 0 || 3.1 || .500 || .600 || .600 || .5 || .1 || .1 || .0 || 1.6
|- class="sortbottom"
| style="text-align:center;" colspan="2"|Career
| 233 || 46 || 16.2 || .399 || .356 || .780 || 1.7 || 1.3 || .6 || .1 || 6.3

Playoffs

|-
| style="text-align:left;"|2022
| style="text-align:left;"|Toronto
| 3 || 0 || 1.7 || .000 || .000 || 1.000 || .3 || .0 || .0 || .0 || .3
|- class="sortbottom"
| style="text-align:center;" colspan="2"|Career
| 3 || 0 || 1.7 || .000 || .000 || 1.000 || .3 || .0 || .0 || .0 || .3

College

|-
| style="text-align:left;"|2014–15
| style="text-align:left;"|Kansas
| 26 || 6 || 11.2 || .306 || .288 || .833 || 1.2 || .7 || .3 || .0 || 2.8
|-
| style="text-align:left;"|2015–16 
| style="text-align:left;"|Kansas
| 35 || 0 || 12.8 || .450 || .402 || .680 || 1.3 || .9 || .3 || .1 || 5.4
|-
| style="text-align:left;"|2016–17 
| style="text-align:left;"|Kansas 
| 36 || 25 || 27.3 || .443 || .398 || .702 || 3.0 || 1.3 || .9 || .3 || 9.8
|-
| style="text-align:left;"|2017–18
| style="text-align:left;"|Kansas
| 39 || 39 || 34.5 || .434 || .444 || .804 || 3.9 || 2.7 || 1.2 || .3 || 14.6
|- class="sortbottom"
| style="text-align:center;" colspan="2"|Career
| 136 || 70 || 22.6 || .428 || .409 || .746 || 2.5 || 1.5 || .7 || .2 || 8.7

Personal life
Following Russia's invasion of Ukraine on February 23, 2022, Mykhailiuk along with the only other Ukrainian NBA player, Alex Len, released a statement condemning the invasion. The statement read "A great tragedy befell our dear homeland of Ukraine. We categorically condemn the war. Ukraine is a peaceful, sovereign state inhabited by people who want to control their own destiny. We pray for their families, friends, and relatives and all the people who are in the territory of Ukraine. We hope for an end to this terrible war as soon as possible. Dear fellow Ukrainians, hold on! Our strength is in unity! We are with you!"

References

External links

1997 births
Living people
2014 FIBA Basketball World Cup players
BC Cherkaski Mavpy players
Detroit Pistons players
Kansas Jayhawks men's basketball players
Los Angeles Lakers draft picks
Los Angeles Lakers players
National Basketball Association players from Ukraine
New York Knicks players
Oklahoma City Thunder players
Raptors 905 players
Small forwards
South Bay Lakers players
Sportspeople from Cherkasy
Toronto Raptors players
Ukrainian expatriate basketball people in the United States
Ukrainian men's basketball players